Celebration Square is a 290,000 square foot outdoor civic centre, park and amphitheatre located on City Centre Drive in Mississauga, Ontario. The project was first announced to begin construction in 2007 and completed in 2011.  The two firms, CS&P architects and Janet Rosenberg + Associates were responsible for the design and construction of the park. The park was commissioned as a demolition and renovation of the two previous ‘library’ and ‘city hall’ squares in the downtown area of Mississauga. The design features an expansive turf grass field with adjacent amphitheatre, a surrounding stone path, benches, canopies and secondary stage. The square's large water feature becomes ice rink in the winter and doubles as an event space when needed. The project is said to juxtoposition small intimate spaces with large open areas of turf. The transformation has dramatically increased the use of the property for daily civic life.

Dimensions and features 

 Gross Area: 290'000 square feet
 Two Digital Screens: 15' x 28'

Build cost and initial traffic 
The project costed $40 million to build. In its first few months of being opened to the public, the park was able to attract over 1 million visitors.

Canada Day celebration 
Celebration Square’s Canada day event is an annual festival that includes cultural performances, and celebrity music guests. The event has grown to attract over 100,00 visitors and hosted the likes of musicians such as Carly Rae Jepsen, Down with Webster, and the Strumbellas. The event concludes with a firework showcase at 10:00 pm.

Other notable events 

 Amacon Mississauga Rotary Ribfest
 Outdoor Movie Nights
 Mississauga Latin Festival
 Diwali at Celebration Square
 The 2019 Toronto Raptors final drew over 20,000 fans

Awards

Mississauga Urban Design Awards Competition winner

Other nominees 

 The Community Common at 355 Princess Royal Dr.
 The Streetsville outdoor pool redevelopment.
 Sandford Farm Neighbourhood Park.
 First Meadowvale Centre.
 The Great Punjab Business Centre.
 The Applewood outdoor pool redevelopment.
 The Stonewater townhouse project at 1437 Lakeshore Rd. E.
 Lion’s Club of Credit Valley outdoor pool redevelopment.
 Harold E. Kennedy Park in Port Credit.
 The Vandyk Group of Companies head office on Fowler Dr.

References 

Mississauga
Parks in Ontario